Jacobus may refer to:
 Jacobus, an English gold coin of the reign of James I
 Jacobus (horse), an American race horse
 Jacobus (name), a given name and surname
 Jacobus, Pennsylvania, United States

See also 
 Jacob (disambiguation)